Rhinow is a town in the Havelland district (Landkreis), in Brandenburg, Germany. It is situated 16 km north of Rathenow, and 22 km south of Kyritz. Rhinow is the administrative seat (Verwaltungssitz) of the Rhinow district (Amt).

Geography 
The region lies on the southern edge of the Rhinluch (Rhin moor) and at the feet of the up to 110 Meter high Rhinower Mountains. The Rhin river flows west through the district into the Gülper See at the southwestern border. Federal highway (Bundesstraße) 102 cuts through the area. Since 2003, the stretch between Rathenow and Neustadt (Dosse) is no longer served by public rail transit (Öffentlichen Personennahverkehr).

Administrative division 
Greater Rhinow includes the village of Kietz.

History 
During the Third Reich, a famous sail plane school was founded in memory of  Otto Lilienthal.

Demography

Politics

City Council 

The council of the city of Rhinow has 12 members with the following distribution by political party:

FDP 6 seats
SPD 3 seats
CDU 2 seats
Die Linke 1 seat

(As of elections held on September 28, 2008)

Elections in 2014:
 SPD: 4 
 FDP: 2 
 The Left: 2 
 CDU: 1 
 Single candidates: 3

Architecture 
 101 Meter high radio tower belonging to Deutsche Telekom AG constructed from reinforced concrete with uncustomary asymmetry at 52° 44′ 45″ N, 12° 21′ 7″ E, was built during the Soviet era.

Personalities 
Otto Lilienthal (1848-1896), settled in Rhinow in 1893, building his workshop for his glider. In the beginning, he flew also in the Rhinow Mountains, later switching to flying at Gollenberg.

References 

Localities in Havelland